Godzianów  is a village in Skierniewice County, Łódź Voivodeship, in central Poland. It is the seat of the gmina (administrative district) called Gmina Godzianów.

The village has a population of 921.

References

Villages in Skierniewice County